William Lerton Pinto (April 8, 1899 – May 13, 1983) was a pitcher in Major League Baseball. He played for the Philadelphia Phillies.

External links

1899 births
1983 deaths
Sportspeople from Chillicothe, Ohio
Major League Baseball pitchers
Philadelphia Phillies players
London Tecumsehs (baseball) players
Harrisburg Senators players
Lawrence Merry Macks players
Baseball players from Ohio
Nashville Vols players
Crisfield Crabbers players